Burcot is a small village in the Bromsgrove district of Worcestershire.

Burcot has a village hall, which is available for hire. It has a garden centre and the Guild of Craftsmen.

The village was listed in the Domesday Book in 1086 when it was known as Bericote.

Compass

References

Villages in Worcestershire